The 2016 Pacific hurricane season was an event in the annual cycle of tropical cyclone formation, in which tropical cyclones form in the eastern Pacific Ocean. The season officially started on May 15 in the eastern Pacific–east of 140°W–and on June 1 in the central Pacific–between the International Date Line and 140°W–and ended on November 30. These dates typically cover the period of each year when most tropical cyclones form in the eastern Pacific basin. However the first storm, Pali, formed 5 months before the official start of the season on January 7, which broke the record for having the earliest forming storm within the basin.

During the season, 22 tropical depressions developed within the basin, 21 of which became tropical storms. 13 of the tropical storms reached hurricane strength, with six achieving major hurricane intensity. Additionally, Tropical Storm Otto entered the basin after crossing over from the Atlantic, thus further contributing to the season total.

Four time zones are utilized in the basin: Central for storms east of 106°W, Mountain between 114.9°W and 106°W, Pacific between 140°W and 115°W, and Hawaii–Aleutian for storms between the International Date Line and 140°W. However, for convenience, all information is listed by Coordinated Universal Time (UTC) first with the respective local time included in parentheses. This timeline includes information that was not operationally released, meaning that data from post-storm reviews by the National Hurricane Center is included. This timeline documents tropical cyclone formations, strengthening, weakening, landfalls, extratropical transitions, and dissipations during the season.

Timeline

January
January 7
06:00 UTC (8:00 p.m. HST, January 6) at  – Tropical Depression One-C develops 935 miles (1,505 km) south of Johnston Island.
12:00 UTC (11:00 a.m. HST) at  – Tropical Depression One-C strengthens into Tropical Storm Pali while located about 900 miles (1,450 km) south of Johnston Island, thus becoming the earliest named storm in the Central Pacific.

January 12

00:00 UTC (2:00 p.m. HST, January 11) at  – Tropical Storm Pali strengthens into a Category 1 hurricane, becoming the earliest recorded hurricane within the basin, about 615 miles (985 km) south-southwest of Johnston Island.
18:00 UTC (8:00 a.m. HST) at  – Hurricane Pali strengthens into a Category 2 hurricane about 725 miles (1,165 km) south of Johnston Island.

January 13
00:00 UTC (2:00 p.m. HST, January 12) at  – Hurricane Pali weakens to a Category 1 hurricane roughly 770 miles (1,235 km) south of Johnston Island.
18:00 UTC (8:00 a.m. HST) at  – Hurricane Pali weakens to a tropical storm about 910 miles (1465 km) south of Johnston Island.

January 14
12:00 UTC (2:00 a.m. HST) at  – Tropical Storm Pali rapidly weakens to a tropical depression approximately 995 miles (1,600 km) south-southwest of Johnston Island.
18:00 UTC (8:00 a.m. HST) at  – Tropical Depression Pali degenerates into a remnant low about 1,015 miles (1,635 km) south-southwest of Johnston Island.

January 15
 00:00 UTC (2:00 p.m. HST, January 14) – The remnants of Pali dissipate.

May
May 15
The 2016 Pacific hurricane season officially begins.

June
June 6
12:00 UTC (7:00 a.m. CDT) at  – Tropical Depression One-E develops from an area of low pressure about 180 miles (290 km) south-southwest of Puerto Escondido, Mexico.
18:00 UTC (1:00 p.m.

June 8
00:00 UTC (7:00 p.m.
12:00 UTC (7:00 a.m. CDT)  The remnants of One-E dissipate.

July

July 2
00:00 UTC (5:00 p.m. PDT, July 1) at  – Tropical Depression Two-E develops from an area of low pressure about 690 mi (1,110 km) southwest of the southern tip of the Baja California peninsula.
18:00 UTC (2:00 p.m. PDT) at  – Tropical Depression Two-E intensifies into Tropical Storm Agatha roughly 800 mi (1,285 km) southwest of the Baja California peninsula.
18:00 UTC (12:00 p.m.

July 3
06:00 UTC (9:00 p.m.
06:00 UTC (11:00 p.m.

July 4
12:00 UTC (6:00 a.m.
18:00 UTC (11:00 a.m. PDT) at  – Tropical Storm Agatha weakens to a tropical depression about 1,250 mi (2,010 km) west-southwest of the Baja California peninsula.

July 5
06:00 UTC (11:00 p.m. PDT, July 4) at  – Tropical Depression Agatha degenerates into a remnant area of low pressure roughly 1,375 mi (2,215 km) west-southwest of the Baja California peninsula.
06:00 UTC (11:00 p.m. PDT, July 4) at  – Hurricane Blas strengthens into a Category 2 hurricane roughly 805 mi (1,295 km) southwest of the southern tip of Baja California.
18:00 UTC (11:00 a.m.

July 6

00:00 UTC (8:00 p.m.
12:00 UTC (2:00 a.m.
18:00 UTC (12:00 p.m.

July 8
00:00 UTC (5:00 p.m.
12:00 UTC (2:00 a.m. HST)  the remnants of Agatha dissipate over the Central Pacific.
12:00 UTC (6:00 a.m. PDT) – Tropical Depression Four-E intensifies into Tropical Storm Celia roughly 725 mi (1,165 km) south-southwest of the Baja California peninsula.
18:00 UTC (11:00 a.m.

July 9
06:00 UTC (2:00 a.m.

July 10
06:00 UTC (11:00 p.m.
18:00 UTC (11:00 a.m. PDT) – Tropical Storm Celia intensifies into a Category 1 hurricane approximately 955 mi (1,535 km) southwest of the Baja California peninsula.

July 11
12:00 UTC (6:00 a.m.
18:00 UTC (11:00 a.m.

July 12
 00:00 UTC (5:00 p.m. PDT, July 11)  The remnants of Blas dissipate.
12:00 UTC (5:00 a.m. PDT) – Hurricane Celia weakens to a Category 1 hurricane roughly 1,265 mi (2,035 km) west-southwest of the Baja California peninsula.
12:00 UTC (6:00 a.m.

July 13
06:00 UTC (11:00 p.m. PDT, July 12) – Hurricane Celia weakens to a tropical storm approximately 1,570 mi (2,525 km) east-southeast of the Hawaiian Islands.
18:00 UTC (12:00 p.m.

July 15
06:00 UTC (11:00 p.m. PDT, July 14) – Hurricane Darby intensifies into a Category 2 hurricane roughly 780 mi (1,255 km) southwest of the Baja California peninsula.
12:00 UTC (6:00 am.

July 16
00:00 UTC (5:00 p.m. PDT, July 15) – Tropical Storm Celia degenerates into a remnant area of low pressure about 775 mi (1,245 km) east of the Hawaiian Islands.
00:00 UTC (6:00 p.m.
12:00 UTC (5:00 a.m. PDT) – Hurricane Darby intensifies into a Category 3 hurricane roughly 945 mi (1,520 km) west-southwest of the Baja California peninsula.
18:00 UTC (11:00 a.m.

July 17
06:00 UTC (11:00 p.m. PDT, July 16) – Hurricane Darby weakens to a Category 2 hurricane about 1,100 mi (1,770 km) west-southwest of the Baja California peninsula.
18:00 UTC (12:00 p.m.

July 18
00:00 UTC (5:00 p.m. PDT, July 17) – Hurricane Darby weakens to a Category 1 hurricane roughly 1,255 mi (2,020 km) west-southwest of the Baja California peninsula.

July 19
06:00 UTC (11:00 p.m. PDT, July 18) – Hurricane Darby weakens to a tropical storm approximately 1,380 mi (2,220 km) east-southeast of the Hawaiian Islands.

July 21
06:00 UTC (1:00 a.m.
06:00 UTC (12:00 a.m. MDT) – Tropical Depression Eight-E develops from an area of low pressure approximately 805 mi (1,295 km) southwest of Manzanillo, Mexico.
12:00 UTC (7:00 a.m.

July 22

00:00 UTC (5:00 p.m. PDT, July 21) – Tropical Storm Estelle degenerates into a remnant area of low pressure about 1,605 mi (2,585 km) east-southeast of the Hawaiian Islands.
12:00 UTC (5:00 a.m. PDT) – Tropical Depression Eight-E intensifies into Tropical Storm Georgette roughly 855 mi (1,375 km) south-southwest of the Baja California peninsula.

July 24
00:00 UTC (5:00 p.m. PDT, July 23) – Tropical Storm Georgette intensifies into a Category 1 hurricane about 1,025 mi (1,650 km) southwest of the Baja California peninsula.
18:00 UTC (11:00 a.m. PDT) – Hurricane Georgette intensifies into a Category 2 hurricane about 1,105 mi (1,780 km) southwest of the Baja California peninsula.

July 25
00:00 UTC (5:00 p.m. PDT, July 24) – Hurricane Georgette intensifies into a Category 3 hurricane about 1,130 mi (1,820 km) southwest of the Baja California peninsula.
06:00 UTC (11:00 p.m.
12:00 UTC (2:00 a.m.
12:00 UTC (5:00 a.m. PDT) – Hurricane Georgette weakens to a Category 3 hurricane about 1,175 mi (1,890 km) west-southwest of the Baja California peninsula.

July 26
00:00 UTC (2:00 p.m.
00:00 UTC (5:00 p.m. PDT, July 25) – Hurricane Georgette weakens to a Category 2 hurricane about 1,220 mi (1,965 km) west-southwest of the Baja California peninsula.
06:00 UTC (11:00 p.m. PDT, July 25) – Hurricane Georgette weakens to a Category 1 hurricane about 1,235 mi (1,990 km) west-southwest of the Baja California peninsula.
12:00 UTC (5:00 a.m.
18:00 UTC (11:00 a.m. PDT) – Hurricane Georgette weakens to a tropical storm about 1,240 mi (1,995 km) west-southwest of the Baja California peninsula.

July 27
00:00 UTC (5:00 p.m.
06:00 UTC (11:00 p.m. PDT, July 26) – Tropical Storm Georgette degenerates into a remnant area of low pressure about 1,245 mi (2,005 km) west-southwest of the Baja California peninsula.
12:00 UTC (5:00 a.m. PDT) – Hurricane Frank weakens to a tropical storm about 655 mi (1,055 km) west of the Baja California peninsula.

July 28
12:00 UTC (5:00 a.m. PDT) – Tropical Storm Frank degenerates into a remnant area of low pressure roughly 895 mi (1,440 km) west-northwest of the Baja California peninsula.

August
August 3

00:00 UTC (5:00 p.m. PDT, August 2) – Tropical Depression Ten-E develops from an area of low pressure about 750 mi (1,205 km) southwest of the Baja California peninsula.
06:00 UTC (11:00 p.m. PDT, August 2) – Tropical Depression Ten-E intensifies into Tropical Storm Ivette roughly 820 mi (1,320 km) southwest of the Baja California peninsula.

August 5
18:00 UTC (11:00 a.m.

August 7

06:00 UTC (1:00 a.m.
12:00 UTC (7:00 a.m.

August 8
06:00 UTC (8:00 p.m. HST, August 7) – Tropical Storm Ivette weakens to a tropical depression about 990 mi (1,595 km) east-southeast of the Hawaiian Islands.
18:00 UTC (8:00 a.m. HST) – Tropical Depression Ivette degenerates to a remnant area of low pressure roughly 910 mi (1,465 km) east-southeast of the Hawaiian Islands.
18:00 UTC (12:00 p.m.

August 9
03:30 UTC (9:30 p.m.
12:00 UTC (6:00 a.m.
18:00 UTC (12:00 p.m.

August 18
12:00 UTC (6:00 a.m.

August 19
06:00 UTC (12:00 a.m.

August 20
12:00 UTC (6:00 a.m.

August 21

18:00 UTC (11:00 a.m.

August 23
06:00 UTC (11:00 p.m.
12:00 UTC (5:00 a.m. PDT) – Tropical Depression Kay degenerates to a remnant area of low pressure about 630 mi (1,015 km) west of the Baja California peninsula.

August 24
06:00 UTC (12:00 a.m.

August 25
06:00 UTC (12:00 a.m.

August 26
18:00 UTC (11:00 a.m. PDT) – Tropical Depression Fourteen-E develops from an area of low pressure about 1,295 mi (2,085 km) east-southeast of the Hawaiian Islands.

August 27
00:00 UTC (5:00 p.m.
00:00 UTC (5:00 p.m. PDT, August 27) – Tropical Depression Fourteen-E intensifies into Tropical Storm Madeline about 1,250 mi (2,010 km) east-southeast of the Hawaiian Islands.
12:00 UTC (5:00 a.m.

August 28
12:00 UTC (5:00 a.m. PDT) – Hurricane Lester weakens to a Category 1 hurricane about 905 mi (1,455 km) west-southwest of the Baja California peninsula.

August 29
06:00 UTC (11:00 p.m. PDT, August 28) – Hurricane Lester re-intensifies into a Category 2 hurricane about 1,160 mi (1,865 km) west-southwest of the Baja California peninsula.
12:00 UTC (5:00 a.m. PDT) – Hurricane Lester intensifies into a Category 3 hurricane about 1,255 mi (2,020 km) west-southwest of the Baja California peninsula.
18:00 UTC (11:00 a.m. PDT) – Hurricane Lester intensifies into a Category 4 hurricane about 1,335 mi (2,180 km) west-southwest of the Baja California peninsula.

August 30
06:00 UTC (11:00 p.m. PDT, August 29) – Hurricane Lester weakens to a Category 3 hurricane about 1,470 mi (2,365 km) southeast of the Hawaiian Islands.

August 31

00:00 UTC (5:00 p.m. PDT, August 30) – Hurricane Lester re-intensifies into a Category 4 hurricane about 1,245 mi (2,005 km) southeast of the Hawaiian Islands.
06:00 UTC (11:00 p.m.

September
September 1
00:00 UTC (5:00 p.m.
06:00 UTC (11:00 p.m.

September 2
00:00 UTC (5:00 p.m.
12:00 UTC (5:00 a.m.

September 3
18:00 UTC (8:00 a.m.

September 4
06:00 UTC (8:00 p.m.
12:00 UTC (7:00 a.m.
18:00 UTC (1:00 p.m.

September 5

18:00 UTC (12:00 p.m.

September 6
06:00 UTC (12:00 a.m.
14:00 UTC (8:00 a.m.

September 7
06:00 UTC (12:00 a.m.
08:30 UTC (2:30 a.m.
18:00 UTC (8:00 a.m.
18:00 UTC (12:00 p.m.

September 11
00:00 UTC (6:00 p.m. MDT, September 10) – Tropical Depression Sixteen-E develops from an area of low pressure about 805 mi (1,295 km) south-southwest of the Baja California peninsula.
06:00 UTC (11:00 p.m. MDT, September 10) – Tropical Depression Sixteen-E intensifies into Tropical Storm Orlene about 685 mi (1,105 km) southwest of the Baja California peninsula.

September 12

06:00 UTC (11:00 p.m. PDT, September 11) – Tropical Storm Orlene intensifies into a Category 1 hurricane about 705 mi (1,135 km) southwest of the Baja California peninsula.
18:00 UTC (11:00 a.m.

September 13
18:00 UTC (11:00 a.m.

September 15
00:00 UTC (5:00 p.m. PDT, September 14) – Hurricane Orlene weakens to a tropical storm about 665 mi (1,070 km) west-southwest of the Baja California peninsula.
12:00 UTC (5:00 a.m. PDT) – Tropical Storm Orlene re-intensifies into a Category 1 hurricane about 765 mi (1,230 km) west-southwest of the Baja California peninsula.

September 16
00:00 UTC (5:00 p.m. PDT, September 15) – Hurricane Orlene weakens to a tropical storm for a second time about 880 mi (1,415 km) west-southwest of the Baja California peninsula.

September 17
00:00 UTC (5:00 p.m. PDT, September 16) – Tropical Storm Orlene degenerates to a remnant area of low pressure about 1,120 mi (1,800 km) west of the Baja California peninsula.

September 18
00:00 UTC (6:00 p.m.
06:00 UTC (12:00 a.m.

September 19

06:00 UTC (12:00 a.m.
18:00 UTC (11:00 a.m.

September 20
06:00 UTC (11:00 p.m.
18:00 UTC (11:00 a.m.

October
October 23
06:00 UTC (11:00 p.m.
12:00 UTC (5:00 a.m.

October 24
12:00 UTC (5:00 a.m.

October 25
00:00 UTC (5:00 p.m.
12:00 UTC (5:00 a.m.
18:00 UTC (11:00 a.m.

October 26
18:00 UTC (11:00 a.m.
October 27
00:00 UTC (5:00 p.m.
06:00 UTC (11:00 p.m.
18:00 UTC (11:00 a.m.

October 28
06:00 UTC (11:00 p.m.

November
November 13
06:00 UTC (12:00 a.m.
12:00 UTC (6:00 a.m.

November 14
06:00 UTC (11:00 p.m.
12:00 UTC (5:00 a.m.

November 25
03:30 UTC (10:30 p.m. CST) – Tropical Storm Otto enters the East Pacific basin near the Gulf of Papagayo in northwestern Costa Rica.

November 26
12:00 UTC (7:00 a.m.
18:00 UTC (1:00 p.m.

November 30
The 2016 Pacific hurricane season officially ends.

See also

List of Pacific hurricanes
Timeline of the 2016 Atlantic hurricane season
Timeline of the 2016 Pacific typhoon season

Notes

References

External links

 The National Hurricane Center's 2016 Tropical Cyclone Advisory Archive
 The National Hurricane Center's Tropical Cyclone Reports for the 2016 Eastern Pacific hurricane season
 The Central Pacific Hurricane Center's Tropical Cyclone Advisory Archive

2016 Pacific hurricane season
Pacific hurricane meteorological timelines
Articles which contain graphical timelines
2016 EPac T